John Macias or in Spanish, Juan Macías, was a Spanish saint.

Juan Macías may also refer to:
Juan Carlos Macías (born 1945), Argentine directors
Juan José Serrano Macías (born 1981), Spanish footballer